Belturbet was the former terminus station of both the 4¼ mile Ballyhaise to Belturbet branch of the Great Northern Railway (Ireland) line and of the Cavan and Leitrim Railway. For many years the station was somewhat derelict but it is now fully restored and houses a museum. The platform remains extant too and a small length of track has been reinstated together with some rolling stock.

Gallery

References 

Disused railway stations in County Cavan
Railway stations opened in 1862
Railway stations closed in 1959
1862 establishments in Ireland
Railway stations in the Republic of Ireland opened in the 19th century